Carmine Boal (born February 28, 1956) is an American former politician. She served as a representative in the Iowa House of Representatives from the 70th District from 1999 to 2008.

Early life
Boal was born on February 28, 1956, in Mount Pleasant, Iowa. Her parents are Edward and Wilma Roth. She graduated from WACO High School in 1974 and she received her associates degree in executive legal secretarial work from the AIB College of Business in 1976. She received a degree in journalism and public relations from Drake University. She married Steven Boal and the couple have a daughter and two sons.

Political career
Her political experience includes serving as assistant majority leader in the Iowa House. Boal was re-elected in 2006 with 10,945 votes, running unopposed. She is currently on the Boards and Commissions at State of Iowa.

Committees
During her tenure in the Iowa House, Boal served on several committees:
Education committee
Judiciary committee
State Government committee, where she was the ranking member.  
Education Appropriations Subcommittee.

References

External links
 Boal on Project Vote Smart
 Boal's Capitol Web Address

Republican Party members of the Iowa House of Representatives
Living people
1956 births
Women state legislators in Iowa
People from Mount Pleasant, Iowa
People from Ankeny, Iowa
21st-century American women